Lopholatilus is a small  genus of tilefishes native to the western Atlantic Ocean.

Species
There are currently two recognized extant species in this genus:
 Lopholatilus chamaeleonticeps Goode & T. H. Bean, 1879 (Great northern tilefish)
 Lopholatilus villarii A. Miranda-Ribeiro, 1915 (Tile fish)

There is also an extinct species:

 †Lopholatilus ereborensis Carnevale & Godfrey, 2014

References

Malacanthidae